Dewan Mohammad Idris is a Bangladesh Nationalist Party politician and the former Member of Parliament of Dhaka-20.

Career
Idris was elected to parliament from Dhaka-20 as a Bangladesh Nationalist Party candidate in 1979.

Personal life
Idris's son, Dr Dewan Mohammad Salahuddin, contested the 2018 General Election from Dhaka-19 as a candidate of Bangladesh Nationalist Party against Awami League candidate Dr Md. Enamur Rahaman.

References

Bangladesh Nationalist Party politicians
Living people
2nd Jatiya Sangsad members
Year of birth missing (living people)